The fan-tailed berrypecker (Melanocharis versteri) is a species of bird in the family Melanocharitidae.
It is found in New Guinea.
Its natural habitat is subtropical or tropical moist montane forest.

The female is darker-colored and bigger than the male, an unusual feature for a passerine (Kikkawa 2003).

References

External links
Image at ADW

fan-tailed berrypecker|fan-tailed berrypecker
Birds of New Guinea
fan-tailed berrypecker
Taxonomy articles created by Polbot